Germania, Texas is a ghost town in Midland County, Texas, USA.

History
The town was founded in 1883. There was a post office from 1884 to 1887.

References

1883 establishments in Texas
Unincorporated communities in Midland County, Texas
Ghost towns in Texas
Populated places established in 1883
Unincorporated communities in Texas